Gabriel Araújo may refer to:

 Gabriel Araújo (footballer) (born 1992), Brazilian footballer
 Gabriel Araújo (swimmer) (born 2002), Brazilian paralympic swimmer